Robin Stevens (born 15 January 1988) is an American-born English author of children's fiction, best known for her Murder Most Unladylike series. She has spoken of the Golden Age of Detective Fiction as an influence on her work.

Early life
Stevens was born in California and moved to Oxford, England at the age of three. She has dual US and UK citizenship. She attended The Dragon School and Cheltenham Ladies College. Her father, Robert Stevens, was Master of Pembroke College, Oxford, and her mother worked at Oxford University's Ashmolean Museum. Her grandfather was the literary critic Wayne C. Booth.

Stevens studied English at the University of Warwick, later gaining an MA in crime fiction from King's College London. She appeared as Captain of the Warwick University team on University Challenge.

Career
Before becoming a full-time author, Stevens worked as a bookseller at Blackwell's bookshop in Oxford, and as an editor at Egmont.

Stevens started writing Murder Most Unladylike as part of National Novel Writing Month in November 2010, but did not send it to agencies for two years.

Stevens has cited the Golden Age of Detective Fiction as an influence on her work – particularly the authors Agatha Christie, Ngaio Marsh, Margery Allingham, and Dorothy L. Sayers.

In November 2020 she announced that she was to have a new book out in August 2021, called Once Upon a Crime. She also announced that there would be a new book (the first of a new series), coming out in 2022. The Ministry of Unladylike Activity will star Hazel Wong's (read below) little sister and two other characters, as yet to be named. This new series is set during World War II.

Murder Most Unladylike
Stevens's eleven book series Murder Most Unladylike consists of schoolgirl detectives, Hazel Wong and Daisy Wells, as they solve murders, as well as personal things. Hazel falls in love with American boy Alexander Arcady, as Daisy struggles with her feelings for other girls. She eventually comes out to Hazel as she falls for Martita Torrera in book seven, Death In The Spotlight, and begins a relationship with Amina from Deepdean during "Death Sets Sail". As well as ten full-length murder mysteries, there are also six mini mysteries featuring these characters. Stevens has vocalised how she believes LGBTQI+ relationships are not portrayed in children's literature at all, and not enough in literature in general, and so she has made many of the characters LGBTQ+.

The series is set in the 1930s, sparking the Golden Age references. It also focuses on period-typical homophobia and racism.

Awards

Works

Series

 The Murder Most Unladylike Series
 Murder Most Unladylike (2014)
 Arsenic For Tea (2014)
 First Class Murder (2015)
 Jolly Foul Play (2016)
 Mistletoe and Murder (2016)
 Cream Buns and Crime: Tips, tricks and tales from the Detective Society (2017)
 A Spoonful of Murder (2018)
 Death in the Spotlight (2018)
 Top Marks for Murder (2019)
 The Case of the Drowned Pearl (2020)
 Death Sets Sail (2020)
 Once Upon a Crime (2021)

   The Ministry of Unladylike Activity Series 
  The Ministry of Unladylike Activity (2022)

Standalone
The Guggenheim Mystery (2017), a sequel to The London Eye Mystery by Siobhan Dowd

Contributor
Mystery and Mayhem: Twelve Deliciously Intriguing Mysteries (2016)
Return to Wonderland: Stories Inspired by Lewis Carroll's Alice (2019)

References

External links
Official website
Author profile - Penguin Books
Official Twitter

1988 births
English children's writers
Living people
Alumni of the University of Warwick
People educated at Cheltenham Ladies' College
People educated at The Dragon School
Alumni of King's College London
British women children's writers